Amankwah is a surname. Notable people with the surname include:

Alex Amankwah (born 1992), Ghanaian middle-distance runner
Frank Amankwah (born 1971), Ghanaian footballer 
Yaw Amankwah Mireku (born 1979), Ghanaian footballer
Yaw Ihle Amankwah (born 1988), Norwegian footballer 

Surnames of Akan origin